Neapolis, was a coastal town on the European side of the Bosphorus in ancient Thrace. It may also have been called Comarodes.

Its site is located near modern Yeni Köy, near Istanbul, Turkey.

References

Populated places in ancient Thrace
Former populated places in Turkey
Roman towns and cities in Turkey
Populated places of the Byzantine Empire
History of Istanbul Province